Mario Rossy is a jazz bassist, composer, and educator.

Biography
In 1988, Rossy was a bassist for Tete Montoliu's And Orquestra Taller De Musics recording. In 1993, Rossy played on the albums New York-Barcelona Crossing, Volumen 1 and New York-Barcelona Crossing, Volumen 2, with saxophonist Perico Sambeat, pianist Brad Mehldau, and drummer Jorge Rossy, Mario's brother. A further recording from that year, When I Fall in Love, without Sambeat, was credited to the Mehldau & Rossy Trio.

Mario Rossy is an instructor at the Berklee College of Music.

Discography

As leader/co-leader
Rossy plays bass on all albums.

As sideman

References

Living people
Year of birth missing (living people)